Yardley Wood is an area of Birmingham, United Kingdom, covering the easternmost quadrant of postcode area B14 (as well as Priory Rd and adjacent streets up to the city boundary), and is located across the wards of Billesley and Highter's Heath in the south of the city.

To the west the area is contiguous with Warstock.
Other nearby settlements include Billesley, Hall Green, Solihull Lodge, Highter's Heath and Kings Heath.

Yardley Wood is remote from the Birmingham suburb of Yardley which is located to the east of the city, although historically (prior to the 1911 Greater Birmingham Act) they were both in Yardley Rural District and hence lay within Worcestershire.

Transport
The area is served by Yardley Wood railway station, despite the station being located just inside the Hall Green (B28 postcode) area, as well as by the following bus routes:

Additionally bus route 76 (Northfield to Solihull) serves the railway station. All these bus services are run by National Express West Midlands who have a large depot in Yardley Wood with over 400 employees.

The Stratford-upon-Avon Canal runs through Yardley Wood (marking the boundary between Billesley and Highter's Heath wards) sitting in a deep cutting where it passes beneath School Road. The canal towpath can be accessed at Yardley Wood Road (bridge no. 5), at a location once known as Happy Valley, and from Priory Fields Nature Reserve (in turn accessed from Priory Road), as well as at High Street, Solihull Lodge (bridge no. 7).

Community
Local schools include Yardley Wood Community Primary School, plus Highters Heath Community School (on the border with Warstock) and Our Lady of Loudes RC Primary School (on the border with Billesley).

Yardley Wood library is located on Highfield Road.

Christ Church, Yardley Wood is the local parish church. There is also a local Baptist Church.

The area includes a Community Centre (adjacent to Highters Heath School) and a Social Club as well as a number of linked areas of natural beauty.

References

 
Areas of Birmingham, West Midlands